Gymnoplectron is a genus of cave wētā in the family Rhaphidophoridae, endemic to New Zealand.

Cook et al (2010) found that Gymnoplectron and Turbottoplectron are synonymised with Pachyrhamma.

Species
 Gymnoplectron acanthocerum (Milligan, 1926)
 Gymnoplectron delli (Richards, 1954)
 Gymnoplectron edwardsii (Scudder, 1869)
 Gymnoplectron fuscum (Richards, 1959)
 Gymnoplectron giganteum Richards, 1962
 Gymnoplectron longicaudum (Richards, 1959)
 Gymnoplectron longipes (Colenso, 1887)
 Gymnoplectron ngongotahaense Richards, 1961
 Gymnoplectron spinosum Richards, 1961
 Gymnoplectron tuarti Richards, 1961
 Gymnoplectron uncatum (Richards, 1959)
 Gymnoplectron waipuense (Richards, 1960)
 Gymnoplectron waitomoense (Richards, 1958)

References

Ensifera genera
Cave weta